9.3×74mm R (designated as the 9,3 x 74 R by the C.I.P.) is a medium-bore cartridge designed in Germany around 1900.

Design

The 9.3×74mmR is of a rimmed, bottleneck design and uses a  diameter bullet, usually weighing . This cartridge is used for hunting medium to large game animals and is very popular in Europe for wild boar. It remains a popular cartridge for African safari hunting in countries with more German influence like Namibia, favored as a continental alternative to the more popular .375 H&H Magnum. Outside Europe, Ruger formerly produced the Ruger No. 1 falling-block rifle in this cartridge, but have currently discontinued production of any rifles in this caliber.

The cartridge is also a very popular chambering for double rifles both in side-by-side and over-and-under barrel configurations .

See also
 9.3×64mm Brenneke
 List of rifle cartridges
 9 mm caliber
 Table of handgun and rifle cartridges

References

External links
 A Most Marvelous Metric - The 9.3mm holds the light heavyweight crown among European bore sizes and should be more popular stateside than it is - by Craig Boddington 
 Jagen Weltweit, 9,3x74 R by Norbert Klups 

Pistol and rifle cartridges
Rimmed cartridges